Martella may refer to:

People
 Brian Martella (born 1951), Australian rules football player
 Bruno Martella (born 1992), Italian football player
 Luigi Martella (1948-2015), Italian bishop
 Vincent Martella (born 1992), American actor, voice actor and singer

Fictional characters
 Viv Martella, character in The Bill

Animals
 Martella (spider), genus of ant mimicking jumping spider
 Parategeticula martella, moth of the family Prodoxidae